Levent Gök (born 24 October 1959) is a Turkish politician from the Republican People's Party (CHP) who currently serves as one of the three parliamentary group leaders for his party since 22 August 2014. He succeeded Muharrem İnce, who resigned to contest the 18th CHP Extraordinary Convention as a leadership candidate. He has been a Member of Parliament for Ankara's first electoral district since the 2011 general election.

Early life and career
Levent Gök was born in Balıkesir on 24 October 1959 and graduated from Ankara University Faculty of Law. Becoming a freelance lawyer, he was an executive board member of the Human Rights Association and also served as a delegate for the Turkish Bars Association. He is married with two children and can speak English at a fluent level.

Political career

Member of Parliament
Having served as the President of the Republican People's Party (CHP) Ankara Provincial Branch, Gök was elected as a CHP Member of Parliament for Ankara's first electoral district in the 2011 general election. He was re-elected in June 2015 and November 2015.

Party Council and group leader
In 2012, Gök was elected to the CHP Party Council, but resigned on 22 August 2014 after being elected as one of the party's parliamentary group leaders. He was elected after Muharrem İnce, a former group leader, resigned in order to run against Kemal Kılıçdaroğlu in the 18th CHP Extraordinary Convention. He was re-elected to the position in the 25th and 26th Parliaments in June and November 2015 respectively, serving alongside Özgür Özel and Engin Altay.

See also
Ankara (electoral districts)

References

External links
MP profile on the Grand National Assembly website
Collection of all relevant news items at Haberler.com

Living people
1959 births
People from Balıkesir
Ankara University Faculty of Law alumni
Deputies of Ankara
Contemporary Republican People's Party (Turkey) politicians
Members of the 24th Parliament of Turkey
Members of the 25th Parliament of Turkey
Members of the 26th Parliament of Turkey